This article lists baronial families in the territories of the Austro-Hungarian Empire, whether extant or extinct. They held no style, but were normally addressed as Gnädiger Herr (Gracious Lord), Gnädige Frau, or Gnädiges Fräulein (Gracious Lady). Titles of nobility were formally abolished in Austria in 1919.

The German forms of the titles are Freiherr (baron), Freifrau (baroness, wife of a baron) and Freiin (baroness, daughter of a baron).

Where this section is blank, it is possible that the preposition is unknown or did not exist.

 
Barons